Çalış may refer to:

People
 Taşkın Çalış (born 1993), Turkish footballer

Places
 Çalış, Haymana, town in Ankara Province, Turkey

Turkish-language surnames